Warreopsis is a genus of flowering plants from the orchid family, Orchidaceae. It contains 4 known species, native to southeastern Central America and to northwestern South America.

Species accepted as of June 2014:

Warreopsis colorata (Linden & Rchb.f.) Garay - Venezuela, Colombia, Ecuador
Warreopsis pardina (Rchb.f.) Garay - Colombia, Ecuador
Warreopsis parviflora (L.O.Williams) Garay - Costa Rica, Panama
Warreopsis purpurea P.Ortiz - Colombia

See also 
 List of Orchidaceae genera

References

External links 

Zygopetalinae genera